A Landsmannschaft (Latin natio, plural nationes) is a German fraternity of several fraternity forms called Studentenverbindung.

The older forms of Landsmannschaften were part of corporations and are closely aligned with the beginnings of universities in medieval times of the 12th and 13th centuries.

The newer forms of Landsmannschaften are a kind of reform corps and most Landsmannschaften are members of the Coburger Convent.

This is also the term for a Jewish burial society: landsmanshaft

History 

In order to understand the history of German fraternities, it needs to be known that the first universities in Europe were established in the 12th and 13th century in Paris (France), Bologna and Padua (Italy), and later also in Oxford and Cambridge (England). Students joined groups in regards to region in order to have protection as well as support in being heard in their interests. The two early forms were called nations (Nationes) or colleges (Collegien) and organized not only the work but also social life and had major influence in universities as they elected the head of a university (magister) in some areas.

Landsmannschaften formerly had the character of guilds. They were loosely organized bodies of students from the same region or nation naturally enough drawn together by their longings for companionship. A good example is the Mosellanerlandsmannschaft of the University of Jena. It contained members from the Rhineland, Palatinate, Swabia, and Alsace. The purposes of the organizations in general were:
 to encourage friendship;
 to compel the adjustment of difficulties arising among members;
 to protect a “brother member” against slander or other attack from outsiders;
 to share in social enjoyments;
 to perform friendly services for one another;
 to yield to the will of the majority;
 to obey the president as long as he directs for the best interests of the organization.
By 1786, this code had grown to 86 paragraphs.

Notable members

Karl von Bardeleben
Johann Becker (politician)
Heinrich Biltz
Peter Harry Carstensen
Johannes Conrad
Christian August Crusius
Thomas Dehler
Wilhelm Dörpfeld
Rolf Emmrich
Paul Flechsig
Levin Goldschmidt
Ernst Haeckel
Otto Hahn
Herbert Haupt
Oscar Hertwig
Gottlob Honold
Theodor Koch-Grunberg
Friedrich August Körnicke
Georg Kükenthal
Hermann Löns
Karl Marx
Franz Melde
Ernst von Mohl
Gottfried Münzenberg
Günther Oettinger
Hermann Oncken
Josef Priller
Johannes Rehmke
Walter Reppe
Heinrich Sahm
Ferdinand Sauerbruch
Clemens Schmalstich
Ferdinand Schneider
Joseph Schröter
Ludwig Schwamb
Ernst Siehr
Wilhelm Sievers
Hans-Heinrich Sievert
Wilhelm Solf
Heinrich Spoerl
Johannes Steinhoff
Theodor Thierfelder
Wilhelm Trübner
Rainer Wieland
Alexander von Zagareli

See also 
 Nations in Finnish universities
 Nations in Swedish universities
 Sudetendeutsche Landsmannschaft

References

External links 
 Homepage of "Landsmannschaft Ulmia Tübingen"

Student societies in Germany